Paramallosia is a monotypic beetle genus in the family Cerambycidae described by Ernst Fuchs in 1955. Its only species, Paramallosia afghanica, was described by the same author in the same year.

References

Saperdini
Beetles described in 1955
Monotypic beetle genera